Dead Man's Gold is a 1948 American Western film starring Lash LaRue and Al "Fuzzy" St. John, the first of his Westerns for producer Ron Ormond.

Plot
When rancher Jim Thornton discovers gold in Gold Valley he sends for Lash and Fuzzy to protect his treasure from a band of gunslingers.

Cast
Lash LaRue 	as Lash LaRue
Al St. John 	as Fuzzy Q. Jones 
Peggy Stewart 	as June Thornton
Terry Frost 	as Joe Quirt
John Cason 	as Matt Conway
Pierce Lyden 	as Sliver
Lane Bradford 	as Mayor Evans
 Stephen Keyes 	as Henchman Morgan 
Marshall Reed 	as Man on Stagecoach
 Britt Wood 	as Bartender 
 Cliff Taylor 	as Townsman

References

External links

1948 films
American Western (genre) films
Films directed by Ray Taylor
1948 Western (genre) films
Lippert Pictures films
American black-and-white films
1940s English-language films
1940s American films